Tade Adepoyibi is an Australian actress of African origin. She played Frances Elaine Newton in USA television series 'Deadly Women'.

Filmography

References

Year of birth missing (living people)
Living people
Australian television actresses